Clyde Leroy Sukeforth (November 30, 1901 – September 3, 2000), nicknamed "Sukey", was an American professional baseball catcher, coach, scout and manager. He was best known for signing the first black player in the modern era of Major League Baseball (MLB), Jackie Robinson, after Robinson was scouted by Tom Greenwade in the Negro leagues.

Eye injury impaired playing career
Sukeforth was born in Washington, Maine.

He appeared in 486 games over all or parts of ten big-league seasons (1926–34 and 1945), compiling a batting average of .264 with 326 hits, two home runs and 96 runs batted in.

Two years later he lost partial sight of his right eye from being hit by a shotgun pellet while bird hunting on November 16. He was able to continue his playing career, but his batting suffered, and in  Sukeforth was traded to the Brooklyn Dodgers. In mid-1934, the Dodgers sent Sukeforth to the minor leagues, where he became a player-manager in 1936.

Witnessed Robinson's historic signing
He also was activated by Brooklyn at age 43 for 18 games during the first three months of the  season, the last year of the World War II manpower shortage, despite not having played competitively since 1939, when he was a player-manager at Elmira. Sukeforth started 13 games as Brooklyn's catcher, and collected 15 hits, although only one was for extra bases, a double struck against Jim Tobin of the Boston Braves on April 24. He batted .288 in 55 at-bats.

Sukeforth soon retired permanently from the playing ranks and resumed his former job as a Brooklyn coach and occasional special-assignment scout. In that capacity, later that season, he would make history. Dodger president Branch Rickey was making secret plans to break organized baseball's six-decades-long "gentleman's agreement" that enforced racial segregation. In August, Rickey sent Sukeforth to Chicago, where Robinson's team, the Kansas City Monarchs of the Negro leagues, was slated to play the Chicago American Giants. Rickey told Sukeforth to urge Robinson to come back with him to Brooklyn for a meeting with Rickey and the Dodgers. Sukeforth met Robinson again in Toledo, Ohio, and the two men traveled by railway to Brooklyn for the historic meeting at the Dodgers' Montague Street offices on August 28.

In addition to serving on Durocher's coaching staff and his scouting assignments for Dodgers president Rickey, he worked behind the scenes in 1946 to help create the new Nashua Dodgers of the Class B New England League. Sukeforth helped the Nashua team forge ties with the New Hampshire community, easing the racial integration of the league when Roy Campanella and Don Newcombe were assigned to that club.

Turned down two managerial opportunities
Sukeforth won his only two games as the Dodgers' manager in 1947, 5–3 and 12–6, both against Boston. Durocher had been suspended for the entire 1947 season by Commissioner of Baseball Happy Chandler because of "conduct detrimental to baseball." But Sukeforth and a fellow coach, Ray Blades, both turned down the opportunity to serve as acting manager for the rest of the season; ultimately, Brooklyn scout and longtime Rickey associate Burt Shotton assumed that role, and Shotton led the Dodgers to the 1947 National League pennant.

In , when Dodger manager Chuck Dressen needed a reliever to face the New York Giants' Bobby Thomson in the ninth inning of the decisive third game of the National League pennant playoff, Sukeforth, coaching in the Dodger bullpen, passed over Carl Erskine and sent in Ralph Branca, who gave up Thomson's "shot heard 'round the world". On January 9, 1952, Sukeforth resigned as a Dodgers coach, then a few weeks later signed to be a coach with the Pittsburgh Pirates, where Rickey was executive vice president and general manager. 

There, as a coach and occasional scout, he played a pivotal role in the drafting of Roberto Clemente from the Brooklyn organization in the  Rule 5 draft. Rickey initially sent Sukeforth to scout former major league pitcher Joe Black, who was toiling for Brooklyn's Montreal Royals Triple-A affiliate.  Instead, Sukeforth became interested in a 20-year-old Dodger prospect: Clemente. Sukeforth told Pirates' beat writer Les Biederman, "I knew then he'd be our first draft choice." Before leaving, he recalled, "I told Montreal manager Max Macon to take good care of 'our boy' and see that he didn't get hurt."  Good to his word, the Pirates drafted Clemente on November 22, 1954. Clemente forged an 18-year Hall of Fame career with the Pirates, leading them to the 1960 and 1971 world championships, compiling an even 3,000 hits, and earning an immediate elevation to Cooperstown after his untimely death in a plane crash while on a humanitarian mission to earthquake-ravaged Nicaragua on December 31, 1972.

Once again passing up a Major League managing assignment after turning down the chance to succeed Pirate skipper Bobby Bragan on August 3, Sukeforth retired as a coach at the end of the 1957 season.

Late career
Sukeforth remained in the Pirates organization as a scout and occasional minor league manager through . Later, he worked as a scout for the Atlanta Braves. Sukeforth died at the age of ninety-eight at his home in Waldoboro, Maine.

In popular culture
Sukeforth appears in the Norman Rockwell painting Bottom of the Sixth.

He was interviewed in Ken Burns's 1994 documentary Baseball.

In 42, the 2013 theatrical sports film about Robinson's breaking of the baseball color line, Sukeforth — played by actor Toby Huss — is portrayed as meeting Robinson at a rural filling station where the Monarchs' team bus had stopped (rather than the actual locale, Comiskey Park in Chicago), and urging Robinson to travel with him to Brooklyn for his meeting with Rickey. Another scene has Huss hitting fungos right-handed (although Sukeforth was a left-handed hitter) as he teaches Robinson how to play first base. In addition, the on-screen Sukeforth, wearing uniform #40, is shown in one of the film's last scenes as the Dodgers' third base coach who congratulates Robinson on hitting a dramatic home run.

References

Further reading

External links

Clyde Sukeforth at The Deadball Era

1901 births
2000 deaths
Albany Senators players
Atlanta Braves scouts
Baseball players from Maine
Brooklyn Dodgers coaches
Brooklyn Dodgers managers
Brooklyn Dodgers players
Cincinnati Reds players
Clinton Owls players
Elmira Pioneers players
Leaksville-Draper-Spray Triplets players
Major League Baseball catchers
Major League Baseball scouts
Minneapolis Millers (baseball) players
Montreal Royals managers
Nashua Millionaires players
People from Knox County, Maine
People from Waldoboro, Maine
Pittsburgh Pirates coaches
Pittsburgh Pirates scouts